Callophrys suaveola is a small butterfly found in the Palearctic (Russia - Dzhungarsky Alatau, Tarbagatai, Saur, Altai) that belongs to the blues family.

Description from Seitz

suaveola Stgr. (72 f), from Central Asia, is as large as the largest European specimens [of Callophrys rubi], the upperside darker, the underside deeper green. From Saisan and Lepsa; as true rubi also occurs in these localities, suaveola may turn out to be the summer-brood.

See also
List of butterflies of Europe

References

Callophrys
Butterflies described in 1881